Arael Argüelles Rodríguez (born 30 April 1987) is a Cuban football player.

Club career
He played for his provincial team Cienfuegos in Cuba.

International career
Argüelles represented Cuba's U-23 national team in the 2008 CONCACAF Men Pre-Olympic Tournament, playing in two group game losses against Honduras and Panama.

He made his senior international debut for Cuba in an international friendly against Guatemala on 23 August 2014.

He was called up to the 2015 CONCACAF Gold Cup, but defected after the opening 6–0 loss against Mexico. Keyler García, Darío Suárez and Ariel Martinez also fled their country at the same tournament.

References

External links 

1987 births
Living people
Cuban footballers
Cuba international footballers
Association football goalkeepers
FC Cienfuegos players
Defecting Cuban footballers
2015 CONCACAF Gold Cup players
People from Cienfuegos